Philomen Probert is a British classicist and academic, specialising in linguistics. She is Professor of Classical Philology and Linguistics at the University of Oxford.

Early life and education
From 1991 to 1995, Probert studied Literae Humaniores (classics) at Exeter College, Oxford, graduating with a Bachelor of Arts (BA) degree. Remaining at Exeter College, she undertook postgraduate studies in general linguistics and comparative philology, completing her Master of Philosophy (MPhil) degree in 1997. She then moved to St John's College, Oxford, where she undertook research towards her Doctor of Philosophy (DPhil) degree under the supervision of Anna Morpurgo Davies. She completed her DPhil in 2000 with a thesis titled "Studies in ancient Greek accentuation". Her doctoral thesis won the 2002 Conington Prize from the Faculty of Classics.

Academic career 
In 1999, Probert was appointed lecturer in Classical Philology and Linguistics at the University of Oxford and elected a Fellow of Wolfson College, Oxford. In the 2006/2007 academic year, she researched relative clauses in Greek on fellowship at the Center of Hellenic Studies at Harvard University. In 2011 she received a British Academy Mid-Career Fellowship to continue this research. In September 2016, she was awarded a Title of Distinction as Professor of Classical Philology and Linguistics. She was the Acting President of Wolfson College between October 2017 and April 2018.

Her research is focused on Ancient Greek, Latin, Anatolian and Indo-European linguistics, and the Graeco-Roman grammatical tradition.

Selected works

References 

Alumni of Exeter College, Oxford
Living people
Year of birth missing (living people)
British classical scholars
Alumni of St John's College, Oxford
Women classical scholars
Classical scholars of the University of Oxford
Linguists from the United Kingdom
Fellows of Wolfson College, Oxford
Presidents of Wolfson College, Oxford
Women linguists